is a large fossil-fuel thermal power station operated by Tohoku Electric in the town of Seirō, Niigata, Japan. The facility is located on the Sea of Japan coast and is adjacent to Niigata Higashi Port.

History
The Higashi Niigata Thermal Power Station started operations in November 1972. A total of six units (18 generators) were constructed, making it the largest thermal power plant operated by Tohoku Electric and one of the largest in Japan. It was originally supplied by domestic natural gas from the Ago-oki oil and gas field offshore Niigata Prefecture, but since 1998 has been supplied by an LNG terminal installed in the adjacent port area. The Niigata Thermal Power Station and the Shin Sendai Thermal Power Station are also supplied from this facility.

Minato Unit 1 and Port Unit 2 were constructed in 1972 and 1975 as a joint venture between Tohoku Electric and Nippon Light Metals. Unit 1 and Unit 2 (online from 1977 and 1983) are standard fossil-fuel burning steam turbine driven power plants. Unit 3 (on-line 1984 and 1985) is a 1100 deg C-class multi-turbine combined cycle (CC) plant and has Tohoku Electric's first waste heat recovery system employing three gas turbines and one steam turbine per system. Unit 4 (on-line 1999 and 2006) is a 1400 deg C class multi-turbine More Advanced Combined Cycle (MACC) system, with two gas turbines and one steam turbine per system.

Due to power shortages in the grid caused by the Tōhoku earthquake and tsunami in March 2011, two emergency generation systems were installed as a temporary measure, but were dismantled in 2015.

Plant details

See also 

 Energy in Japan
 List of power stations in Japan

External links
Tohoku Electric list of major power stations

Buildings and structures in Niigata Prefecture
1971 establishments in Japan
Natural gas-fired power stations in Japan
Oil-fired power stations in Japan
Seirō, Niigata
Energy infrastructure completed in 1971